NTR bus station is a bus station in Guntur and owned by Andhra Pradesh State Road Transport Corporation. The bus station serves both the city and district services in Andhra Pradesh as well buses from neighboring states of Karnataka, Tamil Nadu and Telangana.

History 

 2015 – Introduction of city bus services to the nearby destinations of Perecherla, Namburu, Yanamadala and Chebrolu.

Structure and amenities
A new mini bus station with 13 platforms is being built in the premises of the present one, to run city and non stop services. It is one Wi-Fi equipped bus stations in the state.

References

Bus stations in Andhra Pradesh
Transport in Guntur
Buildings and structures in Guntur
Memorials to NT Rama Rao